DXSJ may refer to:

DXSJ-FM, a radio station associated with St. Jude Thaddeus Institute of Technology in Surigao City, Philippines
DXSJ-TV, a TV station associated with St. Jude Thaddeus Institute of Technology in Surigao City, Philippines